Red Flash is a soft drink sold by The Coca-Cola Company in the Southwestern United States. It is designed to compete against Big Red brand soft drink that is found in the same market. It was introduced in 2000.

References 

Coca-Cola brands